The Carnahan family is a prominent political family from Missouri. Members of the family have served in the United States House of Representatives, in the United States Senate and in various state offices in Missouri.  Notable members of the family include:

A. S. J. Carnahan (1897–1968), U.S. Representative for Missouri's 8th congressional district (1945–1947, 1949–1961), m. Kathel (née Schupp)
Mel Carnahan (1934–2000), Governor of Missouri (1993–2000), m. (1954) Jean (née Carpenter) (born 1933), U.S. Senator for Missouri (2001–2002)
Russ Carnahan (born 1958), U.S. Representative for Missouri's 3rd congressional district (2005–2013)
Robin Carnahan (born 1961), Missouri Secretary of State (2005–2013), Administrator of General Services (2021-Present)

References

 
Missouri politicians
Political families of the United States